The former First Baptist Church, now the Valleytown Cultural Arts Center is a historic Baptist church building at 101 Chestnut Street in Andrews, Cherokee County, North Carolina.  The Classical Revival brick structure was built in 1923 for a congregation founded in 1902; it was their second building on the site.  The building was used by the congregation until c. 1987, when it was sold to a local nonprofit corporation for use as an arts center.

The building was listed on the National Register of Historic Places in 2002.

See also
National Register of Historic Places listings in Cherokee County, North Carolina

References

Baptist churches in North Carolina
Churches on the National Register of Historic Places in North Carolina
Neoclassical architecture in North Carolina
Churches completed in 1923
Churches in Cherokee County, North Carolina
National Register of Historic Places in Cherokee County, North Carolina
Neoclassical church buildings in the United States